David Nestor (born 1 May 1974) is an Irish Gaelic footballer who plays for Kilmacud Crokes senior team. He previously played for Ballyhaunis and the Mayo county team and received a provincial medal from University College Dublin. In 1995, Nestor was named Mayo Sports Star of the Year.

Competitions
Nestor has played in teams which won or were placed in a number of competitions:
Connacht Under 16 winner 1989
Connacht Minor runner-up 1991
Connacht Under 21 winner 1994
All-Ireland Under 21 runner-up 1994
Connacht Under 21 winner 1995
All-Ireland Junior winner 1995
All-Ireland Under 21 runner-up 1995

References

1974 births
Living people
Ballyhaunis Gaelic footballers
Gaelic football forwards
Kilmacud Crokes Gaelic footballers
Mayo inter-county Gaelic footballers